Vanja Marinković (born 9 January 1997) is a Serbian professional basketball player for Baskonia of the Liga ACB and Euroleague.

Early life
Marinković was born in Belgrade, FR Yugoslavia. He comes from a relatively-sports related family; his father Zoran is a football referee and cinematographer, while his mother Dragana and his six-year older brother both played basketball in their youth. Marinković started playing basketball for Belgrade-based club Vračar where he played from 2006 until 2010. He then moved to Koledž where he stayed for one season.

Club career

Partizan Belgrade
In the summer of 2011, he moved to play with Partizan's youth categories. He continued to play with the youth categories of the team for four seasons, with the exception of the last season in which he played occasionally, as he spent most of his time training with the senior team.

In the 2013–14 season, he started working with the senior team of Partizan, under head coach Duško Vujošević. He debuted for the team in the Serbian Cup game against FMP Belgrade. However, although being capped for the games many times, he occasionally got the chance to play in the rest of the season. Partizan finished the season winning its 13th consecutive domestic league title, defeating archrivals Crvena zvezda by 3-1 in the final series; that would be the only title won over the season. He also became a champion with Partizan's junior team by beating Crvena zvezda in the final game.

In the 2014–15 season, he became a standard part of senior team's rotation. On 8 November, he led his team with season-high 20 points in 65–50 win over MZT Skopje, showing great potential for the future. Three days after turning 18, on 12 January 2015, he signed his first professional, four-year contract with Partizan. Over the season, he appeared in 29 games of the ABA League, averaging 3.9 points, 1.2 rebounds and 0.7 assists per game. He also played in the EuroCup where Partizan was eliminated in the Group E. On 18 September 2015, he appeared in the EuroBasket 2015 special event - FIBA European U-18 All-Star game, consisted of the 24 most talented European players born in 1997 or after. He led his Team Black with 17 points and 4 assists in 82–87 loss to Team Red. Over 26 games of the 2015–16 ABA League, he averaged 6.1 points, 2.6 rebounds and 1.2 assists per game, while shooting 31.3% from the field.

In the 2016–17 season, he averaged 8.2 points, 2.7 rebounds and 1.5 assists per game, while shooting 42.5% from the field over 23 games of the 2016–17 ABA League.

On 14 October 2017, in an ABA League away game versus Zadar in a 104–97, Marinković scored a career-high 33 points, also adding 5 rebounds and 1 assist. Over 20 games of the 2017–18 ABA League, he averaged 11.3 points, 2.9 rebounds and 1.2 assists per game, while shooting 41.3% from the field and 36.1% from the three-point field goal.

In June 2018, he signed a two-year contract extension with the club. Over 23 games of the 2018–19 ABA League, he averaged 12.2 points, 2.4 rebounds and 1.8 assists per game, while shooting 40.2% from the field and 32.8% from the three-point field goal.

Valencia Basket
On 23 July 2019, Marinković signed a two-year contract with the Spanish club Valencia Basket. He left Valencia in June 2021.

Baskonia
On July 7, 2021, he has signed with Baskonia of the Liga ACB.

NBA draft rights
On 20 June 2019, Marinković was the final pick of the 2019 NBA draft, after being selected by the Sacramento Kings. On 10 February 2022, Marinković's draft rights were traded to the Los Angeles Clippers as part of a four-team trade.

National team career
Marinković represented the Serbia men's national under-16 basketball team at the 2013 FIBA Europe Under-16 Championship where they won the silver medal. The following year he was part of the U17 national team that won the bronze medal at the 2014 FIBA Under-17 World Championship.

Career statistics

|-
| style="text-align:left;"| 2016–17
| rowspan="2" style="text-align:left;"| Partizan
|ABA League
| 23 || 26.7 || .421 || .407 || .806 || 2.7 || 1.5 || .6 || .2 || 8.1
|-
| style="text-align:left;"| 2017–18
|Serbian League
| 13 || 23.0 || .546 || .346 || .861 || 1.9 || 2.3 || .9 || .1 || 13.0
|-
| style="text-align:left;"| 2019–20
| style="text-align:left;"| Valencia
|EuroLeague
| 27 || 14.9 || .437 || .329 || .833 || 1.0 || .4 || .4 || .0 || 6.3
|-
| style="text-align:left;"| 2020–21
| style="text-align:left;"| Valencia
|EuroLeague
| 15 ||14.5 || .391 || .362 || .857 || 1.3 || .6 || .2 || .0 || 6.3
|-
|-class=sortbottom
| align="center" colspan=2 | Career
| All Leagues
| 78 || 19.6 || .449 || .365 || .835 || 1.7 || 1.1 || .5 || .1 || 8.0

See also 
 List of NBA drafted players from Serbia
 Sacramento Kings draft history

References

External links
 Vanja Marinković at aba-liga.com
 Vanja Marinković at draftexpress.com
 Vanja Marinković at eurobasket.com
 Vanja Marinković at euroleague.net
 Vanja Marinkovic at FIBA
 
 
Vanja Marinkovic's NBA Draft Profile

1997 births
Living people
ABA League players
Basketball players from Belgrade
Basketball League of Serbia players
KK Partizan players
Point guards
Sacramento Kings draft picks
Saski Baskonia players
Serbian expatriate basketball people in Spain
Serbian men's basketball players
Serbia men's national basketball team players
Shooting guards
Valencia Basket players